Archiearis is a genus of moths in the family Geometridae found in northern nearctic and palearctic areas.

Species
 Archiearis infans (Möschler, 1862) – the infant
 Archiearis notha (Hübner, [1803]) – light orange underwing
 Archiearis parthenias (Linnaeus, 1761) – orange underwing
 Archiearis puella (Esper, 1787) – pale orange underwing
 Archiearis touranginii (Berce, 1870)

References
 Archiearis at Markku Savela's Lepidoptera and Some Other Life Forms

Archiearinae
Geometridae genera
Taxa named by Jacob Hübner